Mexiweckelia hardeni is a species of amphipod in the family Hadziidae.

References

Amphipoda
Articles created by Qbugbot
Crustaceans described in 1992